Loxostege cereralis, the alfalfa webworm, is a species of moth of the family Crambidae. It is found from Quebec to British Columbia, south to Mexico in the west.  

The wingspan is 13–25 mm. Adults are on wing from May to early September.

The larvae feed on alfalfa and a variety of other crops and weed species.

External links
Species info
Bug Guide

Pyraustinae
Moths described in 1872
Taxa named by Philipp Christoph Zeller